First Lieutenant Wells H. Blodgett (January 29, 1839 – May 8, 1929) was an American soldier who fought in the American Civil War. Blodgett received the country's highest award for bravery during combat, the Medal of Honor, for his action during the First Battle of Newtonia in Missouri on September 30, 1862. He was honored with the award on February 15, 1894.

Biography
Blodgett was born in Downer's Grove, Illinois on January 29, 1839 to Israel and Avis Blodgett, two early settlers of DuPage County. He joined the Union Army in Chicago, Illinois. He died on May 8, 1929.

Medal of Honor citation

See also

List of American Civil War Medal of Honor recipients: A–F

References

1839 births
1929 deaths
People of Illinois in the American Civil War
Union Army officers
United States Army Medal of Honor recipients
American Civil War recipients of the Medal of Honor